Real Time is a live album by the Art Farmer/Benny Golson Jazztet featuring Curtis Fuller recorded at the Sweet Basil Jazz Club in New York in 1986 and originally released on the Contemporary label in 1988.

Reception

Scott Yanow of Allmusic said "This highly recommended disc is a near-classic".  The Penguin Guide to Jazz awarded the album 3½ stars saying it  "gives a vivid idea of the group's continued spirit".

Track listing
All compositions by Benny Golson except as indicated
 "Whisper Not" - 11:09
 "Sad To Say" - 5:58
 "Are You Real" - 8:19
 "Autumn Leaves" (Joseph Kosma, Jacques Prévert, Johnny Mercer) - 13:51
 "Along Came Betty" - 9:25

Personnel
Art Farmer - flugelhorn
Benny Golson - tenor saxophone
Curtis Fuller - trombone
Mickey Tucker - piano
Ray Drummond - bass 
Marvin "Smitty" Smith - drums

References 

Contemporary Records live albums
Art Farmer live albums
Benny Golson live albums
1988 live albums